Piazza del Popolo is a city square in Todi, Italy.

Buildings around the square
Concattedrale della Santissima Annunziata
Palazzo del Capitano
Palazzo dei Priori (Todi)
Palazzo del Popolo

Piazzas in Umbria
Todi